Perpignan Cathedral is a Roman Catholic cathedral, and a national monument of France, located in the town of Perpignan in Languedoc-Roussillon. It is dedicated to Saint John the Baptist.

The cathedral was begun in 1324 by King Sancho of Majorca, and later finished in the 15th century. It replaced the cathedral of Elna, and therefore was at first the seat of the Bishop of Elne, and then, from 1602, of the Bishop of Perpignan–Elne.

Description
The cathedral was built in the Catalan Gothic style, because of its association with the Kingdom of Majorca. It has a wide nave (80 meters long, 18 m wide, and 26 m tall) made of seven cross-vaults, and features a short transept and apse, whose vault features seven keys.

The cathedral's western façade was never finished. When being restored in the 19th and 20th centuries, the Gothic window of the façade was rebuilt, as it had previously been substituted by a simple rectangular opening. The façade also features a portico and clock-tower, which date from the 18th century. In the 19th century tuning bells was re-invented. In Perpignan is the first carillon with tuned bells by Amédée Bollée and sons.

References

External links

 Monum.fr entry for Perpignan Cathedral
Location

15th-century Roman Catholic church buildings in France
Basilica churches in France
Roman Catholic cathedrals in France
Churches in Pyrénées-Orientales
Cathedral
Monuments historiques of Pyrénées-Orientales